The Bezirk Dornbirn is an administrative district (Bezirk) in Vorarlberg, Austria. A rather young district, it was separated from the Feldkirch district in 1969.

The area of the district is 172.7 km2, the population 82,721 (January 1, 2012), which makes a population density of 479 persons per km2. The administrative center of the district is Dornbirn.

Administrative divisions 
The district consists of three municipalities, two of which (Dornbirn and Hohenems) are towns, the third (Lustenau) being the largest market town in Austria. Hohenems is the youngest town in Vorarlberg to have received town privileges (in 1983).

Towns 
Dornbirn (46.080)
Hohenems (15.350)

Market town 
Lustenau (21.291)

(population numbers January 1, 2012)

 
Districts of Vorarlberg